Alan Wall is a British novelist and short story writer.

Biography
Wall was born in Bradford and studied at the University of Oxford. After a variety of jobs, he became a full-time writer in his forties. In addition to his work as a professional author, he has developed a career teaching creative writing with posts at Liverpool John Moores University, the University of Birmingham and the University of Chester. He is also a published poet and critic.

Bibliography

Books
Jacob 1993 (Poetry)
Curved Light (1994)
Bless the Thief (1997)
Silent Conversations (1998)
The Lightning Cage (1999)
The School of Night (2001)
China (2003)
Sylvie's Riddle (2008)
Badmouth (2014)

Short fiction 
Richard Dadd in Bedlam and Other Stories (1999)

References

External links
Official web site
Staff page at University of Chester
Guardian book review for Sylvie's Riddle (2008)

Living people
20th-century English novelists
21st-century English novelists
Alumni of the University of Oxford
Asimov's Science Fiction people
English male novelists
20th-century English male writers
21st-century English male writers
Year of birth missing (living people)